Desur is a Town panchayat in Tiruvanamalai district  in the Indian state of  Tamil Nadu.

Geography
It has an average elevation of 114 metres (374 feet).

Demographics
 India census, Desur had a population of 5156. Males constitute 55% of the population and females 45%. Desur has an average literacy rate of 70%, higher than the national average of 59.5%: male literacy is 79% and, female literacy is 60%. In Desur, 10% of the population is under 6 years of age.

References

Cities and towns in Tiruvannamalai district
Jain temples in Tamil Nadu